Orders, decorations and medals of Republika Srpska is a system of awards in Republika Srpska. There are 15 orders and 7 medals.

The president of Republika Srpska confers decorations and awards of Republika Srpska on his/her own initiative or at the suggestion of the Office of orders of Republika Srpska (Kancelarija ordena Republike Srpske).

Decorations and awards can be conferred on citizens of Bosnia and Herzegovina or foreign nationals, legal entities as well as units of the Armed Forces, and the Ministry of Interior. 

Awards are regulated by the "Statutes of orders and medals of Republika Srpska" (Статути ордена и медаља Републике Српске, Statuti ordena i medalja Republike Srpske). By this statute some decorations have a patron saint and a slava.

Beside state decorations some organizations and institutions of Republika Srpska have their own  system of awards.

Decorations

Orders by value

Medals by value

Gallery

References 

 
Orders, decorations, and medals of country subdivisions
Orders, decorations, and medals of Bosnia and Herzegovina